Platinum Hits are select Xbox games that have sold over 400,000 units in the nine months after release.

Platinum Hits may also refer to:

 Platinum Hits (Jason Derulo album), 2016
 Platinum Hits, a 2003 album by Ariel Rivera
 Platinum Hits, a 2001 album by Candyman

See also
Platinum Hit, a Bravo music competition show for singer-songwriters